Renate Elly Künast (born 15 December 1955) is a German politician of Alliance 90/The Greens party. She was the Minister of Consumer Protection, Food and Agriculture from 2001 to 2005 and subsequently served as chairwoman of her party's parliamentary group in the Bundestag.

Early life and career
Künast was born in Recklinghausen, North Rhine-Westphalia. She studied social work in Düsseldorf and worked from 1977 to 1979 in this profession in a jailhouse in Berlin. After that she studied law at the Free University of Berlin until 1985. During her student years, she often protested against the Gorleben nuclear-fuel reprocessing plant.  She later worked as lawyer specializing on aliens law and criminal law.

Political career
Since 1979, Künast has been a member of the German Green Party (Bündnis 90/Die Grünen), first in the Alternative List in West Berlin. In the 1990s she was member of parliament and chairwoman of the Green Party's group in the state parliament of Berlin. During that time, she won cross-party respect for her leading role in drafting a new democratic constitution for the reunified city-state. Künast eventually became the party's spokeswoman for legal issues. In 1998, she re-assumed the floor leadership post alongside Michaele Schreyer.

In national politics, Künast came to be known as a tough negotiator for her work in drafting the national red-green coalition agreement after the 1998 federal parliamentary elections. In October 1999, she was the Green' front-runner in Berlin's parliamentary race.

From June 2000 to March 2001, Künast was co-chair of Bündnis 90/Die Grünen on the national level, together with Fritz Kuhn. Since her party at the time did not allow the combination of functions in the party and the government in one person, she resigned when she became Minister for Food, Agriculture and Consumer Protection in the second government of Germany Gerhard Schröder in 2001. By naming someone with no experience in farming to head a ministry with such sweeping powers, Schröder was widely considered gambling that any loss of support among farmers would be more than compensated by support from ecologically conscious Germans alarmed by the discovery of mad cow disease.

Following the 2002 elections, Künast was part of the Green Party's team in the negotiations with the Social Democrats on a coalition agreement for the second government under the leadership of Chancellor Gerhard Schröder. She held the office of Minister for Food, Agriculture and Consumer Protection until 2005, over time becoming known for increasing consumer protection, supporting organic farming, and expanding animal welfare. During her time in office, she ranked behind only Schröder and Foreign Minister Joschka Fischer in public opinion polls.

After the 2005 federal election, Künast became co-chair of the Green Party's parliamentary group, again together with Fritz Kuhn and later with Jürgen Trittin.

Künast announced on 5 November 2010 that she we would be the candidate for Governing Mayor of Berlin for Alliance 90/The Greens in the 2011 Berlin state election. At the time of the announcement, her party was eight percentage points ahead of the Social Democrats in the opinion polls. Under her leadership, the Green Party came third with 17.6 percent of the vote, ten percentage points behind the Social Democrates but still up from the 13.1 percent they won in the previous election. However, incumbent Klaus Wowereit from the Social Democrats chose to enter a coalition with the conservative CDU, leaving Künast without any role in Berlin state politics.

After the 2013 federal elections, the resignation of Künast and Jürgen Trittin as co-leaders of the Green Party's group in parliament cleared the way for the election of Katrin Göring-Eckardt and Anton Hofreiter. She unsuccessfully ran against Claudia Roth for the office of Vice President of the German Bundestag. Instead, she served as chairwoman of the Committee on Legal Affairs and Consumer Protection from 2014 until 2017. Since 2018, she has been a member of the Committee on Food and Agriculture. Already since 2005, she also been serving on the Committee on the Election of Judges (Wahlausschuss), which is in charge of appointing judges to the Federal Constitutional Court of Germany.

In the negotiations to form a so-called traffic light coalition of the Social Democrats (SPD), the Green Party and the FDP following the 2021 federal elections, Künast led her party's delegation in the working group on agriculture and nutrition; her co-chairs from the other parties are Till Backhaus and Carina Konrad.

Other activities
 Stiftung Forum Recht, Member of the Board of Trustees (since 2022)
 Alice Salomon University of Applied Sciences, Member of the Board of Trustees
 Association of German Foundations, Member of the Parliamentary Advisory Board
 German Forum for Crime Prevention (DFK), Member of the Board of Trustees 
 German Foundation for International Legal Cooperation (IRZ), Member of the Board of Trustees 
 Humanist Union, Member 
 KfW, Ex-Officio Member of the Board of Supervisory Directors (2003-2005)

In addition, Künast serves on the board of trustees of the Berlin-based AIDS-Hilfe (AIDS-Help) group, and is an honorary member of the International Raoul Wallenberg Foundation and the Angelo Roncalli Committee within that organization.

Political positions

Human rights
In 2010, Künast criticized Chancellor Angela Merkel for speaking at an award ceremony for Danish cartoonist Kurt Westergaard in Potsdam, arguing that while it was true that the right to freedom of expression also applies to Westergaard's controversial Muhammad cartoons "if a chancellor also makes a speech on top of that, it serves to heat up the debate."

In August 2012, Künast was one of 124 members of the Bundestag to sign a letter that was sent to the Russian ambassador to Germany, Vladimir Grinin, expressing concern over the trial against the three members of Pussy Riot. "Being held in detention for months and the threat of lengthy punishment are draconian and disproportionate", the lawmakers said in the letter. "In a secular and pluralist state, peaceful artistic acts -- even if they can be seen as provocative -- must not lead to the accusation of serious criminal acts that lead to lengthy prison terms."

In 2015, Künast was the initiator of a bill in favor of legalizing assisted suicide, arguing that "a punishment of commercial euthanasia would expose doctors to the severe risk of legal investigations." However, the Bundestag later voted to criminalize organizations that assist patients seeking to terminate their lives in return for payment and makes assisting a suicide punishable by up to three years in prison.

Regulation of digital platforms
In 2021, Künast requested the personal data of several Facebook users to pursue the authors of 22 insulting comments against her, many of which were of a sexist or violent nature. In 2022, the Federal Constitutional Court sided with Künast personal data.

Economic policy
Amid the financial crisis of 2007–08, Künast proposed to solve the state-owned banks' financial woes and to merge the Germany's then eight regional banks into one institution, which would concentrate on regional economic development. In a 2008 interview with newspaper Welt am Sonntag: "The regional banks should be merged into one and their functions need to be clearly laid out." Ahead of the 2009 federal elections, in an attempt to come up with an antidote to the other political parties' hijacking of green ideas, Künast and her fellow lead candidate Jürgen Trittin backed up their critique of incumbent Chancellor Angela Merkel's government with a "Green New Deal", calling for €20 billion ($27.4 billion) a year to be invested in climate protection, environmental technology and education.

Consumer protection
In 2010, Künast called for a ban on advertising for sweets aimed at children.

Relations with the CDU
Over the course of her career, Künast has regularly dismissed prospects for an alternative coalition between the Greens and Angela Merkel's Christian Democratic Union on a national level.

Recognition
In 2010, Künast – along with Cécile Duflot, Monica Frassoni, and Marina Silva – was named by Foreign Policy magazine to its list of top global thinkers, for taking Green mainstream.

Personal life 
Renate Künast was personally extremely insulted  by hate speech on the net; mostly on Facebook she got sexually insulted. Künast fights more consistently than almost any other German politician against these form of violent by anonymous persons. 

The Berlin Regional Court initially found that these were all permissible expressions of opinion, Künast had provoked these comments because of a misleading statement in 1986 about sex with children. Künast lodged an appeal. As a result, the district court obliged Facebook to provide information about the authors of some comments, so that the politician could take legal action against these people. 

All this has been annulled by the Federal Constitutional Court (BVG) in February 2022. The Berlin courts had not weighed properly. The Berlin court had always evaluated all comments in the context of the discussion, BVG said. But even with a reference to a public debate, not everything is allowed.

Controversy
In July 2009 she was accused of antisemitism by the Jerusalem Post, after she had allegedly been overheard calling the pro-Israel "Stop The Bomb" organisation a "Mossad front", which she denied.

In October 2015 Künast advised the police officer Tania Kambouri during a talk show that the police should take their shoes off before raids in mosques. Kambouri had published a book about her experience with the rising violence by Muslim men against law enforcement and especially against women.

In July 2016 Künast posted a Tweet in which she questioned the shooting of an Afghan refugee and ISIS sympathiser who severely injured five people with an axe. She was criticized for publicly accusing the police of wrongdoing without knowing the details and before the official investigation was started. Members from her party distanced themselves from the statement and said that they trusted the German police. Police union chief Rainier Wendt called her a "parliamentary smart aleck".

Bibliography
 Die Dickmacher. Warum die Deutschen immer fetter werden und was wir dagegen tun müssen. Riemann Verlag, 2004, .
 Klasse statt Masse. Die Erde schätzen, den Verbraucher schützen. Econ Ullstein List Verlag, München 2002.
 ''Der Mordfall Schmücker und der Verfassungs„schutz". Dokumentation seit dem 29. September 1986, vorgelegt von Renate Künast (MdA), Februar 1987. Alternative Liste für Demokratie und Umweltschutz, Fraktion des Abgeordnetenhauses von Berlin, 1987.

References

External links

 Renate Künast, Member of the German Parliament
Renate Künast interview in Exberliner magazine

1955 births
Living people
Agriculture ministers of Germany
Female members of the Bundestag
Federal government ministers of Germany
Members of the Abgeordnetenhaus of Berlin
Members of the Bundestag for Berlin
People from Recklinghausen
Women federal government ministers of Germany
21st-century German women politicians
Women members of State Parliaments in Germany
Members of the Bundestag 2021–2025
Members of the Bundestag 2017–2021
Members of the Bundestag 2013–2017
Members of the Bundestag 2009–2013
Members of the Bundestag 2005–2009
Members of the Bundestag 2002–2005
Members of the Bundestag for Alliance 90/The Greens